Dinger is a surname. Notable people with the surname include:

Derek Dinger (born 1987), German ice hockey player
Fritz Dinger (1915–1943), German World War II flying ace
John R. Dinger (born 1953), American diplomat
Klaus Dinger (1946–2008), German drummer and guitarist, brother of Thomas.
Larry Miles Dinger (born 1946), American diplomat
Thomas Dinger (1952–2002), German musician, brother of Klaus.
Ulla Dinger (born 1955), Swedish mathematician

See also
Dinger (disambiguation)

German-language surnames